Elvira Fernández, vendedora de tiendas is a 1942 Argentine comedy film directed by Manuel Romero. It stars Paulina Singerman, Juan Carlos Thorry, Tito Lusiardo and Sofía Bozán. The film is about the daughter of a millionaire store owner, who organizes a worker strike.

Plot 
Paulina, the daughter of the millionaire owner of a store, becomes employed at the store under an assumed name. She investigates the injustices of the workers and leads a strike, forcing her father and the store operators to bring about improvements in working conditions.

Cast
 Paulina Singerman
 Juan Carlos Thorry
 Tito Lusiardo
 Sofía Bozán
 Enrique Roldán
 Carmen del Moral
 Elena Lucena
 Alberto Terrones
 Juan Mangiante
 Julio Renato
 Salvador Sinaí
 Miguel Di Carlo
 Oscar Savino
 Juan Gamboa
 Fernando Campos

Themes
The film has been compared to other film of the period including Mujeres que trabajan (1938), La rubia del camino (1938), Isabelita (1940), sharing the common theme of "a spoiled young woman [who] learns both the value of hard work and the capacity to care for others under the tutelage of working class characters". Central to the film is the union protest, which has been described as being "quite complex", "summarized in a sequence quite clearly through a series of images [with] passionate speakers".
The speech where Elvira Fernandez anticipates selling her store involuntarily was later used in propaganda films of Peron.

Reception
The El Heraldo del Cinematografista wrote that it "excellently managed the strike movement ... There are effective comic passages throughout the film", while La Nación praised the cinematography. Raúl Manrupe and María Alejandra Portela in their book Un diccionario de films argentinos (1930-1995) wrote: "...a social issue in the service of comedy. 
Another one of Romero's vehicles for Singerman, it would be interesting to rediscover how he crosses fun with reality."

References

Sources cited

External links
 

1942 films
1942 comedy films
Argentine comedy films
1940s Spanish-language films
Argentine black-and-white films
Films directed by Manuel Romero